Thabiso Collin Mokhosi (c.1968 – 10 December 2019) was a South African Army officer, who served briefly as Chief of the South African Army.

He completed his military training in Angola before attending demolition and operational command and control courses in Ukraine, Soviet Union.

He also completed a logistics course in Italy in 1992 after which he returned to South Africa. He served as the Officer Commanding 1 South African Infantry Battalion, Commandant South African Army College. Aide de Camp to the Chief of the SANDF, Director Peace Support Operations before being promoted to major general when he was appointed as General Officer Commanding Joint Operations Headquarters until 31 October 2019. 

He was appointed Chief of the Army on 1 November 2019 and was due to fill the post in 2020 but was subsequently unable to due to illness.

Mokhosi died in hospital on 10 December 2019.

References

South African Army generals
1968 births
2019 deaths
People from Port Elizabeth
Graduates of the Royal College of Defence Studies
UMkhonto we Sizwe personnel